Screaming for More is a DVD release of the band t.A.T.u., in the years 2003-2004. The DVD was released February 2, 2004 in Brazil and on May 18, 2004 in the United States. This release was also available in VCD format.

The DVD has subtitles in English, French, German, Spanish, and Portuguese.

DVD Content
The DVD contains ten music videos, three behind the scenes videos, a photo gallery, performances and a questions and answers feature from Yulia and Lena. However, the photo gallery is not a slideshow and must be pushed by the next or back buttons to see the pictures.

 All the Things She Said & Ya Soshla S Uma
 "All the Things She Said" Video
 "Ya Soshla S Uma" Video
 "All the Things She Said" Remix Video

 Not Gonna Get Us & Nas Ne Dogonyat
 "Not Gonna Get Us" Video
 "Nas Ne Dogonyat" Video
 "Not Gonna Get Us" Remix Video

 "30 Minutes" Video
 "How Soon Is Now?" Video
 Behind the Scenes with Julia and Lena
 Part 1 (in the studios)
 Part 2 (interview and travelling)
 Part 3 (question and answers)

 Performance/Rehearsal Footage
 MTV Europe Awards Countdown Performance
 Not Gonna Get Us Rehearsal

Photo Gallery

 Bonus Materials
 Q&A with Julia and Lena

References

T.A.T.u. video albums